Vishwamurti Shastri is a Sanskrit scholar with knowledge of Vedic literature and related subjects. He served as a principal of Rashtriya Sanskrit Sansthan, Jammu. He was appointed to Amarnathji Shrine Board (SASB) in 2019. He is director of Shri Mata Vaishno Devi Gurukul, Katra. He also serves as the chairman of J&K Dharmarth Trust Advisory Committee.

Prof Shastri has written a number of books in Sanskrit. He has organized many non-formal Sanskrit teaching programs in J&K. He has delivered religious discourses from Shri Mata Vaishno Devi Bhawan, which are telecast live on national TV channels during Navratras.

The Government of India honored him in 2022, with the fourth-highest civilian award of Padma Shri.

Early life and  Education 
Vishwamurti Shastri was born in 1946 in a small village in Ramnagar tehsil of Udhampur district to Pandit Anant Ram Jyotshi and Uma Devi. He successfully completed Shastri in 1965 and Acharya in 1967 from Jammu and Kashmir University. He was awarded a Ph.D. degree by the Rashtriya Sanskrit Sansthan, Deemed University in 1986.

Awards and honours 
Vishwamurti Shastri was awarded the President's award for classical language scholars in 2009. He was awarded the fourth-highest civilian award, Padma Shri by the Indian Government in 2022

References

Living people
Recipients of the Padma Shri in literature & education
People from Jammu and Kashmir
1946 births